Princess Ariane of the Netherlands, Princess of Orange-Nassau (Ariane Wilhelmina Máxima Inés; born 10 April 2007) is the third and youngest daughter of King Willem-Alexander and Queen Máxima. Princess Ariane is a member of the Dutch Royal House and currently third in the line of succession to the Dutch throne.

Life
Prime Minister Balkenende addressed the nation shortly afterwards and said both mother and child were healthy and doing well. The next morning, her father appeared on television with his new daughter. The names of the baby were announced on 26 October, when the birth was registered in The Hague.

Princess Ariane was baptised in the Kloosterkerk, The Hague on 29 October 2007. Vicar Deodaat van der Boon used water from the Jordan River to baptize the princess, who was wearing the christening gown that Princess Wilhelmina first wore in 1880. Over 850 guests were invited to attend, including Princess Máxima's parents and Dutch prime minister Jan Peter Balkenende. Her godparents are Valeria Delger, Inés Zorreguieta, Hereditary Grand Duke Guillaume of Luxembourg, Tijo Baron Collot d’Escury, and Anton Friling.

Princess Ariane speaks Dutch, English and Spanish.

Hospitalisation
On 2 May 2007, Princess Ariane was admitted to the Leiden University Medical Center with a suspected lung infection. She was released from the hospital on 5 May 2007 after treatment for her bacterial and viral infection. On 13 June 2007, Prince Willem-Alexander and Princess Máxima released a thank you note "not only for the congratulations upon Ariane's birth but also for the best wishes they received upon her hospitalisation" and released a third official picture with their newborn daughter. The couple reportedly received over 30,000 letters of well-wishers. On 8 October 2009, Princess Ariane was again admitted to a hospital, in which she had to stay for one night, due to a respiratory infection.

Titles, styles and arms
Ariane's full title and style is "Her Royal Highness Princess Ariane of the Netherlands, Princess of Orange-Nassau. .

References

External links

 Prinses Ariane (official website of the Dutch Royal House)

2007 births
Living people
House of Orange-Nassau
Royal children
Dutch people of German descent
Dutch people of Argentine descent
Dutch people of Basque descent
Dutch people of Italian descent
Dutch people of Portuguese descent
Dutch people of Spanish descent
Princesses of Orange-Nassau
Protestant Church Christians from the Netherlands
People from Wassenaar
Daughters of kings